On 14 October 2022, 12-year-old Lola Daviet was found dead in a travel trunk in the 19th arrondissement of Paris. The prosecutors said that she had been asphyxiated. The main suspect was recorded in the CCTV video carrying heavy luggage, which included the suitcase holding the victim, while leaving the building in the afternoon.

Victim
Lola Daviet, born 18 July 2010 in Béthune, was a student at the Collège Georges Brassens in Paris and was champion of France in aerobics.

Abduction and murder 
On 14 October 2022, at about 16:30 (UTC+1), Johan Daviet reported the disappearance of his daughter to a police station after she failed to return home from school. As the caretaker of the apartment building, he consulted CCTV footage. Lola was seen entering the building at 15:20, before following a woman, suspected to be Dahbia Benkired. According to Benkired's initial confession, she lured Lola into her sister's apartment and ordered the girl to shower. She then forced her victim to perform cunnilingus on her before putting adhesive tape on the girl's face. After Lola's death, Benkired stabbed the body. Lola's mother, Delphine, posted a message on Facebook at 18:45 reporting her daughter's disappearance.

Police found duct tape and a box cutter in the apartment building's basement, and started a criminal investigation. At 23:30, a homeless man reported the discovery of a body inside of a travel trunk, the body had been mutilated and tied up.

Suspect
On 17 October, 24-year-old Dahbia Benkired was indicted on charges of "murder of a minor under 15" and "rape with torture and acts of barbarism". Born in Algiers, Benkired came to France legally in May 2016 on a student visa. She had had no prior criminal record and was known to police as a victim of domestic violence in 2018. She is currently being held in isolation at Fresnes Prison.

Benkired had no job or home, and lived with an acquaintance in Val-de-Marne and her 26-year-old sister in the 19th arrondissement of Paris. Her sister testified to investigators that Benkired had been making incoherent statements at night. Daviet's mother, the caretaker of the apartment where Benkired's sister lived, rejected Benkired's request for a pass to enter the apartment on her own.

Benkired was not known to psychiatric services, and was declared mentally fit to be interviewed by police. Benkired's lawyer, Alexandre Silva, denied that the murder was motivated by race.

On 21 August, Benkired was detained at Orly Airport for having neither a plane ticket nor valid identity papers, and was issued an obligation to leave the French territory (OQTF) the same day. As she had no criminal record, she was not sent to a detention centre, but given 30 days to return to Algeria.

Investigation
During her interrogation, Benkired fluctuated between accepting and denying responsibility, and said that her account of committing the crime was actually a recall of a dream. At points, she blamed the crime on an armed stranger, or a ghost. When shown pictures of the dead body, she said "That doesn't make me hot, or cold. I was raped too and I saw my parents die in front of me". She said that her motive was her dispute with the victim's mother.

Reaction 
After the suspect was identified as having ignored an order to leave French territory, political figures of the right and far-right attacked the government of President Emmanuel Macron for the crime. In the National Assembly, Marine Le Pen of the National Rally (RN) attacked prime minister Élisabeth Borne, who responded by saying that the crime should be left to the police and judiciary. Éric Zemmour of Reconquête coined the term "Francocide" to describe the murder of a French person, for which he was criticised by Gérald Darmanin, the Minister of the Interior. Éric Pauget of The Republicans told the minister of justice Éric Dupond-Moretti that "Lola lost her life because you didn't expel this national".

Macron met Daviet's parents. He condemned the murder as an act of "extreme evil" and the Minister of the Interior was present at Lola's funeral. Her parents called on politicians to not exploit the crime.

See also 
 Murder of Sandra Cantu

References 

Murder in Paris
Rape in France
2022 in Paris
October 2022 events in France
October 2022 crimes in Europe
19th arrondissement of Paris
2022 murders in France
Incidents of violence against girls